Colasposoma atrocyaneum is a species of leaf beetle endemic to Socotra. It was described by Stefano Zoia in 2012. The species name refers to the dark blue color of nearly all the specimens examined, though the species can also have a green color.

References

atrocyaneum
Beetles of Asia
Beetles described in 2012
Endemic fauna of Socotra
Insects of the Arabian Peninsula